Uahekua Herunga is a Namibian politician. A member of SWAPO, Herunga was a regional coordinator for his party in the northwestern Kunene Region prior to his appointment to the 5th National Assembly of Namibia in 2009 as a choice of president Hifikepunye Pohamba. He was subsequently appointed deputy Minister of Environment and Tourism and promoted to Minister in a cabinet reshuffle in December 2012, following the fifth SWAPO congress.

References

Year of birth missing (living people)
Living people
SWAPO politicians
Members of the National Assembly (Namibia)
Environment and tourism ministers of Namibia
People from Kunene Region